Eucaine (beta-eucaine) is a drug that was previously used as a local anesthetic. It was designed as an analog of cocaine and was one of the first synthetic chemical compounds to find general use as an anesthetic. It is a white, crystalline solid.  Prior to World War I, Britain imported eucaine from Germany. During the war, a team including Jocelyn Field Thorpe and Martha Annie Whiteley developed a synthesis in Britain.

The brand name Betacaine can sometimes refer to a preparation containing lidocaine, not eucaine.

Synthesis

Condensation of diacetonamine [625-04-7] (1) with acetaldehyde (paraldehyde) rather than acetone gives the piperidone containing one less methyl group, i.e. 2,2,6-trimethylpiperidin-4-one [3311-23-7] (2). Reduction of the ketone with sodium amalgam gives the alcohol as a mixture of isomers, 2,2,6-trimethylpiperidin-4-ol (3). Benzoylation then affords beta-eucaine (4).

See also
 alpha-Eucaine, a related local anesthetic

References

External links
 

Local anesthetics
Piperidines
Benzoate esters